Cha-am station is a railway station located in Cha-am Subdistrict, Cha-am District, Phetchaburi. Originally, the station was called "Ban Cha-am", but was changed to "Cha-am" in 2010. The station opened in June 1911, as part of the Southern Line Phetchaburi - Cha-am section. The line extended to Hua Hin in November 1911.

Train services 
 Rapid 169/170 Bangkok-Yala-Bangkok
 Rapid 177/178 Thon Buri-Lang Suan-Thon Buri
 Ordinary 261/262 Bangkok-Hua Hin-Bangkok
 Ordinary 251/252 Bang Sue Junction-Prachuap Khiri Khan-Bang Sue Junction
 Ordinary 254/255 Lang Suan-Thon Buri-Lang Suan
 Excursion 911/912 Bangkok-Suan Son Pradiphat-Bangkok

References 
 
 
 

Railway stations in Thailand